Richard Baidoo (born 11 October 1998) is a Ghanaian professional footballer who plays as a goalkeeper on loan at Karela United from Accra Hearts of Oak. He previously played for Samartex in the Ghana Division One League.

Career

Early career and Hearts of Oak 
Baidoo started his career with Accra Hearts of Oak junior side Auroras FC who play in the Ghana Division Two League. He also previously played for Red Bull Ghana Academy. He was later promoted by Hearts of Oak into the senior side and he signed his first professional contract for Hearts of Oak in February 2018. He played the 2019–2020 season on loan at Tarkwa-based Ghana Division One League side Samartex FC. He played for Samartex that season until it was cut short due to the COVID-19 pandemic.

Karela United (loan) 
Baidoo was signed by Nzema-based side Karela United on a season long deal for the 2020–21 season.

Personal life 
Baidoo is a Christian. In 2020, he revealed that he wanted to be a Pastor or an Evangelist and that he used to preach the Word of God in commercial vehicles.

References

External links 

 

Association football goalkeepers
Ghanaian footballers
Accra Hearts of Oak S.C. players
Karela United FC players
Living people
1998 births